The advocate general for Northern Ireland is the chief legal adviser to the Government of the United Kingdom on Northern Ireland law and the post is held by the attorney general for England and Wales by virtue of that office. The advocate general and the solicitor general for England and Wales have, in Northern Ireland, the same rights of audience as members of the Bar of Northern Ireland.

The advocate general was created as a separate office upon the devolution of policing and justice powers to the Northern Ireland Assembly on 12 April 2010.

Unlike the advocate general for Scotland, the position is not supported by a distinct government department. Instead, that support is provided by the civil law and Northern Ireland section within the Attorney General's Office at Westminster.

The chief legal adviser to the Northern Ireland Executive is the attorney general for Northern Ireland.

List of Advocates General 

Colour key (for political parties):

See also 
Law Officers of the Crown
Attorney General for England and Wales
Attorney General for Northern Ireland
Advocate General for Scotland
Department of Justice (Northern Ireland)

References

External links 
Attorney General's Office (England and Wales)
(incorporating Advocate General for Northern Ireland)
Attorney General for Northern Ireland

Law of Northern Ireland
Law of the United Kingdom
Northern Ireland
Region-specific legal occupations
Legal ethics
Law Officers of the Crown in the United Kingdom
2010 establishments in Northern Ireland